Butler School District 53 is a school district headquartered in Oak Brook, Illinois.

History
Paul O'Malley, who previously played minor league baseball, and was superintendent of Norridge School District 80, became superintendent of Butler 53 on July 1, 2019.

In 2021 the district began purchasing 170 air purifier units as well as using LED lighting in place of fluorescent lighting.

References

External links
 
 Articles about the district - Daily Herald

school districts in DuPage County, Illinois